Freddie Stevens born as Frederick William Humphreys was an English actor best known for his role in Tin Men in 1987, and various roles in Emu's TV programmes alongside Carol Lee Scott and Rod Hull. He played the role of Croc, Grotbags long suffering assistant from 1982 to 1984, the role of Robot Redford, Grotbags replacement assistant from 1984 to 1988 and Grovel the man servant from 1988 to 1989. He later appeared in the animated spin off show Rod 'n' Emu in 1991 as the voice of Croc and Redford. He appeared in Emu's Programmes for almost ten years from 1982 to 1991 and over 100 episodes.

He died on 26 January 2016 in Dorset at the age of 81.

Filmography

Film 
Tin Men 1987

Television 

 Emu's World 1982-1984, 1988
 Emu's All Pink Windmill Show 1984-1986
 Emu's Wide-World 1987-1988
 EMU-TV 1989
 Rod Hull: A Bird in the Hand 2003

References

External links
Rod Hull: A Bird in the Hand (TV Movie 2003)

1934 births
2016 deaths
English male television actors
English male comedians
People from Warwickshire
20th-century English male actors